Qishn District is a district of the Al Mahrah Governorate, Yemen. As of 2003, the district had a population of 11,441 inhabitants.

References

Districts of Al Mahrah Governorate